The V-League 1st Season, 2nd Conference is a tournament of the Shakey's V-League. The tournament was held from November 28, 2004 until the final game on February 14, 2005.

Tournament Format
Double Round Robin Tournament
Top four teams will compete in the semi-finals
Semi-Finals is a best of three series with the format, 1 vs 4 and 2 vs 3
Best of Three Championship series

Eliminations

Shakey's V-League conferences
2004 in Philippine sport
2005 in Philippine sport
2004 in volleyball
2005 in volleyball